Rasht County is in Gilan province, Iran. The capital of the county is the city of Rasht. At the 2006 census, the county's population was 847,680 in 244,613 households. The following census in 2011 counted 918,445 people in 293,448 households. At the 2016 census, the county's population was 956,971 in 321,703 households.

Administrative divisions

The population history and structural changes of Rasht County's administrative divisions over three consecutive censuses are shown in the following table. The latest census shows six districts, 18 rural districts, and seven cities.

References

 

Counties of Gilan Province